Anmol Sitaare is a 1982 Bollywood film directed by Geethapriya. The film was a remake of director's own 1981 Kannada film Prachanda Putanigalu.

Cast 
Rakesh Bedi 
Madan Puri 
Seema Deo

Soundtrack
"Aasman Ke Ham Anmol Sitarey Hain" - Anwar, Anuradha Paudwal
"Apne Hindustan Ke Sundar" - Anwar, Anuradha Paudwal
"Choron Ko Pakadne Ham Chale Hain" - Alka Yagnik, Sapna Mukherjee, Amit Kumar, Preeti Sagar, Vinay Mandke
"Jat Hanuman" - Mahendra Kapoor
"Yeh Duniya Hai Natakshala" - Alka Yagnik, Amit Kumar, Shabbir Kumar
"You Don't Know What We Are" - Anwar, Amit Kumar, Alka Yagnik, Preeti Sagar, Dilraj Kaur

References

External links
 

1982 films
Films scored by Nadeem–Shravan
1980s Hindi-language films
Hindi remakes of Kannada films
Indian children's films
Films directed by Geethapriya